Woldingham and Oxted Downs is a  biological Site of Special Scientific Interest east of Caterham in Surrey.

This sloping site on the North Downs has species-rich chalk grassland, woodland and scrub. Common plants in grazed areas include red fescue, sheep’s fescue, quaking grass, yellow oat grass, purging flax, bee orchid, thyme, common centaury and yellow-wort.

References

Sites of Special Scientific Interest in Surrey